Kai Lai Chung (traditional Chinese: 鍾開萊; simplified Chinese: 钟开莱; September 19, 1917 – June 2, 2009) was a Chinese-American mathematician known for his significant contributions to modern probability theory.

Biography
Chung was a native of Hangzhou, the capital city of Zhejiang Province. Chung entered Tsinghua University in 1936, and initially studied physics at its Department of Physics. In 1940, Chung graduated from the Department of Mathematics of the National Southwestern Associated University, where he later worked as a teaching assistant. During this period, he first studied number theory with Lo-Keng Hua and then probability theory with Pao-Lu Hsu.

In 1944, Chung was chosen to be one of the recipients of the 6th Boxer Indemnity Scholarship Program for study in the United States. He arrived at Princeton University in December 1945 and obtained his PhD in 1947. Chung's dissertation was titled “On the maximum partial sum of sequences of independent random variables” and was under the supervision of John Wilder Tukey and Harald Cramér.

In 1950s, Chung taught at the University of Chicago, Columbia University, UC-Berkeley, Cornell University and Syracuse University. He then transferred to Stanford University in 1961, where he made fundamental contributions to the study of Brownian motion and laid the framework for the general mathematical theory of Markov chains. Chung would later be appointed Professor Emeritus of Mathematics of the Department of Mathematics at Stanford.

Chung was regarded as one of the leading probabilists after World War II. He was an Invited Speaker at the ICM in 1958 in Edinburgh and in 1970 in Nice. Some of his most influential contributions have been in the form of his expositions in his textbooks on elementary probability and Markov chains. In addition, Chung also explored other branches of mathematics, such as probabilistic potential theory and gauge theorems for the Schrödinger equation.

Chung's visit to China in 1979 (together with Joseph L. Doob and Jacques Neveu), and his subsequent visits, served as a point of renewed exchange between Chinese probabilists and their Western counterparts. He also served as an external examiner for several universities in the Asian region, including the National University of Singapore.

In 1981, Chung initiated, with Erhan Cinlar and Ronald Getoor, the "Seminars on Stochastic Processes", a popular annual national meeting covering Markov processes, Brownian motion and probability.

Chung also possessed a wide-ranging and intimate knowledge of literature and music, especially opera. He also had an interest in Italian culture and taught himself Italian after he retired. Chung spoke several languages and translated a probability book from Russian to English.

Chung died of natural causes on June 1, 2009, at the age of 91.

Publications

 Elementary Probability Theory; by Kai Lai Chung & Farid Aitsahlia; Springer; .
 A Course in Probability Theory; by Kai Lai Chung.
 Markov Processes with Stationary Transition Probabilities, by Kai Lai Chung.
 Selected Works Of Kai Lai Chung; World Scientific Publishing Company; .
 Green, Brown, & Probability and Brownian Motion on the Line; by Kai Lai Chung; World Scientific Publishing Company; .
 Introduction to stochastic integration (Progress in probability and statistics); K. L. Chung and R. J. Williams.
 Introduction to Random Time and Quantum Randomness; by Kai Lai Chung & Jean Claude Zambrini; World Scientific; .
 Chance & Choice: Memorabilia; Kai Lai Chung.
 Markov Processes, Brownian Motion, and Time Symmetry; (Grundlehren der mathematischen Wissenschaften); by Kai Lai Chung & John B. Walsh.
 From Brownian Motion to Schrödinger's Equation; (Grundlehren der mathematischen Wissenschaften); Kai Lai Chung & Zhongxin Zhao.
 Lectures from Markov Processes to Brownian Motion; (Grundlehren der mathematischen Wissenschaften); by Kai Lai Chung.

Notes

External links
 The Mathematics Genealogy Project: Kai Lai Chung
 IMS Bulletin: IMS members’ news – obituary Kai Lai Chung (1917–2009)
 Stanford Report: Kai Lai Chung, emeritus math professor, to be remembered at November 6 gathering
 Kai Lai Chung died
 Oberwolfach Photo Collection: Details for Kai Lai Chung
 Tsinghua University Obituary: 世界知名概率学家钟开莱校友去世
 Obituary Kai Lai Chung, 1917-2009 Obituary Kai Lai Chung, 1917-2009 

1917 births
2009 deaths
Writers from Hangzhou
Republic of China (1912–1949) emigrants to the United States
Tsinghua University alumni
Princeton University alumni
Stanford University Department of Mathematics faculty
University of Chicago faculty
Columbia University faculty
Cornell University faculty
University of California, Berkeley faculty
Syracuse University faculty
American statisticians
Probability theorists
Boxer Indemnity Scholarship recipients
20th-century American mathematicians
21st-century American mathematicians
Chinese science writers
National Southwestern Associated University alumni
Mathematicians from New York (state)
20th-century Chinese mathematicians